The molecular formula C4H10NO5P (molar mass: 183.10 g/mol, exact mass: 183.0297 u) may refer to:

 L-AP4, or L-2-amino-4-phosphonobutyric acid
 Fosmidomycin

Molecular formulas